XHIL-FM is a radio station on 88.5 FM in Veracruz, Veracruz, Mexico.

History

XEOD-AM 1090 received its concession on January 18, 1955. The Boca del Río-based station was owned by Radiofónica Veracruzana, S.A. and broadcast with 1,000 watts.

In 1986, XEOD was sold to a group headed by Angel López Corona and including nine other people. The station became known as XEIL-AM. It was sold to ACIR in 1994.

When XEIL was approved to migrate to FM in 2010, it became the second station ACIR owned to carry the XHIL-FM call sign. The first was XHIL-FM in Monterrey, which lost its call sign when it was sold by ACIR.

In November 2021, Grupo ACIR reached a deal to sell XHIL and XHCS-FM 103.7 to Radio S.A. November 23 was the last day for the ACIR Amor and Mix formats on these stations. XHCS flipped from English adult contemporary/classic hits as "Mix" to contemporary hit radio using Radio S.A.'s Máxima brand on January 1, 2022.

References

Radio stations in Veracruz
Radio stations established in 1946